Michelle Taryn Friedland (born July 4, 1972) is a United States circuit judge of the United States Court of Appeals for the Ninth Circuit.

Biography

Early life and education

Friedland was born in Berkeley, California. She graduated from The Pingry School in Basking Ridge, New Jersey. She received a Bachelor of Science degree in biology in 1995 from Stanford University, graduating Phi Beta Kappa. She then studied philosophy at Wolfson College, Oxford as a Fulbright Scholar, returning to California for law school. She received a Juris Doctor in 2000 from Stanford Law School, graduating Order of the Coif and second in her class. She served as a law clerk to Judge David Tatel of the United States Court of Appeals for the District of Columbia Circuit and then served as a law clerk to Justice Sandra Day O'Connor of the United States Supreme Court. She completed a two-year lectureship at Stanford Law School before entering private practice.

Professional career

Before her confirmation, Friedland served as a litigation partner in the San Francisco office of Munger, Tolles & Olson LLP. She joined the firm in 2004 as an associate, becoming a partner in January 2010. She has extensive litigation experience at the state and federal trial court and appellate levels, including litigating before the United States Supreme Court.

During her legal career, Friedland represented a number of corporate clients in cases involving a wide range of legal issues, including antitrust, tax, patent, copyright, and consumer class actions. She also frequently represented the University of California in cases involving constitutional issues. She maintained an active pro bono practice. The State Bar of California named a Munger team including Friedland a recipient of the 2013 President's Pro Bono Service Award.  Friedland also has served as an adjunct professor at the University of Virginia Law School, teaching a course on constitutional issues in higher education.

Federal judicial service

On August 1, 2013, President Barack Obama nominated Friedland to a seat on the United States Court of Appeals for the Ninth Circuit. She filled the seat that was vacated by Judge Raymond C. Fisher, who assumed senior status on March 31, 2013. On January 16, 2014, the Senate Judiciary Committee voted to forward her nomination to the full Senate by a 14–3 vote. Cloture was filed on her nomination on April 8, 2014. On April 10, 2014, the motion to invoke cloture was agreed to by a 56–41 vote. On April 28, 2014 her nomination was confirmed by a 51–40 vote. She received her judicial commission on April 29, 2014. Justice Sandra Day O'Connor administered the oath of office to Friedland at her formal investiture on June 13, 2014, in the James R. Browning United States Court of Appeals Building in San Francisco. At the time of her appointment Friedland, then 41, ranked fourth among the youngest appointees to the Ninth Circuit Court of Appeals.

Notable cases
On February 4, 2017, Friedland and Judge William Canby rejected the Trump administration's request for an administrative stay of the district court's temporary restraining order in State of Washington v. Trump, part of the ongoing court cases related to Executive Order 13769, pending full review in the Ninth Circuit. On February 7, Friedland, Canby, and Judge Richard Clifton heard oral arguments on the emergency motion to stay, with an audio feed of the telephonic argument broadcast nationwide. On February 9, the three judges denied the request for a stay of the temporary restraining order.  The case was notably parodied by Saturday Night Live, with Judge Friedland being portrayed by Vanessa Bayer.

On July 3, 2019, in another high-profile ruling, Friedland and Richard R. Clifton upheld a district court's halting of parts of Donald Trump's wall. N. Randy Smith issued a dissent, and on July 26, the Supreme Court overturned Friedland and Clifton by a 5–3 vote on ideological lines with Stephen Breyer saying he would temporarily block the construction of the wall but allow funding to be set aside for it.

In Garcia v. City of Los Angeles, decided on September 2, 2021, Friedland ruled that the city of Los Angeles cannot seize and discard the "bulky items" of homeless individuals.

Personal life

Friedland is married to Daniel Kelly.

See also
 List of Jewish American jurists
 List of law clerks of the Supreme Court of the United States (Seat 8)
 Joe Biden Supreme Court candidates

References

External links

1972 births
Living people
21st-century American judges
American women lawyers
American lawyers
California lawyers
Judges of the United States Court of Appeals for the Ninth Circuit
Law clerks of the Supreme Court of the United States
Lawyers from Berkeley, California
People associated with Munger, Tolles & Olson
Pingry School alumni
Stanford Law School alumni
Stanford Law School faculty
United States court of appeals judges appointed by Barack Obama
University of Virginia School of Law faculty
American women legal scholars
21st-century American women judges
Fulbright alumni